Meta is the third album by the American band Car Bomb. The album was produced by Gojira's Joseph Duplantier and guitarist Greg Kubacki and released independently on digital and CD formats on 28 October 2016.

In September, the band released five second fragments of the song "From the Dust of This Planet" through music sharing for fans to assemble in any order to form a complete song. Tracks "From the Dust of This Planet", "Sets", and "Gratitude" were released as previews and "Black Blood" as a video.

The album features guest vocals from Joe Duplantier on "The Oppressor" and Suffocation's Frank Mullen on "Sets".

Reception
The album was praised in a review for its originality and how "paralyzing and oppressively heavy" it is. Axl Rosenberg of MetalSucks exclaimed "My mind is too blown by this record."

Track listing

Personnel
Michael Dafferner – lead vocals
Elliot Hoffman – drums
Greg Kubacki – guitar
Jon Modell – bass
Joe Duplantier – guest vocals on "The Oppressor"
Frank Mullen – guest vocals on "Sets"
Produced by Joe Duplantier and Greg Kubacki
Mixed and mastered by Josh Wilbur
Engineered by Alexis Berthelot

References 

Car Bomb (band) albums
2016 albums